ISO 2 is an international standard for direction of twist designation for yarns, complex yarns, slivers, slubbings, rovings, cordage, and related products.

The standard uses capital letters S and Z to indicate the direction of twist, as suggested by the direction of slant of the central portions of these two letters.  The handedness of the twist is the direction of the twists as they progress away from an observer. Thus Z-twist is said to be right-handed, and S-twist to be left-handed.  The convention of using these two letters to unambiguously designate twist direction was already used in the cordage industry by 1957.

References

External links
 ISO 2:1973 Textiles — Designation of the direction of twist in yarns and related products

Yarn
00002